Sherman Pass (el. 5575 ft./1699 m.) is a high mountain pass that crosses the Kettle River Range in the state of Washington. It is the highest pass in the state maintained all year. The pass is located on the Sherman Pass Scenic Byway which traverses the Colville National Forest.  The pass is surrounded by the aftermath of the 1988 White Mountain Fire. The pass was named after American Civil War general William Tecumseh Sherman who traveled across the pass in 1883.

References

External links 
 Sherman Pass road conditions

Landforms of Ferry County, Washington
Mountain passes of Washington (state)
Transportation in Ferry County, Washington